A softphone is a software program for making telephone calls over the Internet using a general purpose computer rather than dedicated hardware. The softphone can be installed on a piece of equipment such as a desktop, mobile device, or other computer and allows the user to place and receive calls without requiring an actual telephone set. Often, a softphone is designed to behave like a traditional telephone, sometimes appearing as an image of a handset, with a display panel and buttons with which the user can interact. A softphone is usually used with a headset connected to the sound card of the PC or with a USB phone.

Applications
See Comparison of VoIP software

Communication protocols
To communicate, both end-points must support the same voice-over-IP protocol, and at least one common audio codec.

Many service providers use the Session Initiation Protocol (SIP) standardized by the Internet Engineering Task Force (IETF). Skype, a popular service, uses proprietary protocols, and Google Talk leveraged the Extensible Messaging and Presence Protocol (XMPP).

Some softphones also support the Inter-Asterisk eXchange protocol (IAX), a protocol supported by the open-source software application Asterisk.

Features
A typical softphone has all standard telephony features (DND, Mute, DTMF, Flash, Hold, Transfer etc.) and often additional features typical for online messaging, such as user presence indication, video, wide-band audio. Softphones provide a variety of audio codecs, a typical minimum set is G.711 and G.729.

Requirements
To make voice calls via the Internet, a user typically requires the following:
 A modern PC with a microphone and speaker, or with a headset, or USB phone.
 Reliable high-speed Internet connectivity like digital subscriber line (DSL), or cable service.
 Account with an Internet telephony service provider or IP PBX provider.
 Mobile or landline phone.

See also

Auto dialer
Chatcord
Comparison of VoIP software
Computer telephony integration
H.323
List of SIP software
Mobile VoIP
Videotelephony
VoIP phone

References

VoIP software